The Natural Resources Stewardship Project was a Canadian non-profit organization that presented itself as undertaking "a proactive grassroots campaign to counter the Kyoto Protocol and other greenhouse gas reduction schemes while promoting sensible climate change policy."  The group was founded in October 2005 but failed from lack of funding.<ref>Ball, Tim. "Personal Attacks, Never the Issues," Frontier Centre for Public Policy," 10 October 2010.</ref>

A report in the Toronto Star on January 28, 2007 stated that the organization had not revealed who funds the Stewardship Project.  The Guardian and Vancouver Sun'' stated in 2008 that the organization is funded by energy firms.

Until April 2008, it was headed by global warming denier Tom Harris, formerly Ottawa director of the consulting firm High Park Group, and, until later in 2008, Tim Ball, geographer at the University of Winnipeg. Harris has stated that the NRSP was set up on the initiative of the High Park Group.

NRSP has been mentioned in at least two op-ed pieces. 

According to the Toronto Star, the group has been described by critics as an Astroturf organization.

References

External links
Natural Resources Stewardship Project 
Sourcewatch: Natural Resources Stewardship Project

Climate change denial
Natural resources organizations
Organizations of environmentalism skeptics and critics
Year of establishment missing